The Western Michigan Broncos men's soccer team represents Western Michigan University in all NCAA Division I men's college soccer competitions. As of the next NCAA men's soccer season in 2023, the Broncos compete in the Missouri Valley Conference (MVC), following the dropping of men's soccer by WMU's full-time home of the Mid-American Conference (MAC). The team currently plays in the soccer-specific WMU Soccer Complex on the campus. The team has qualified for NCAA Tournament a total of three times, earning berths in 2003, 2017, and 2022. The team won the MAC regular season championship in 2017.

Joining Missouri Valley Conference
Following the Mid-American Conference's decision to suspend sponsorship of men's soccer following the 2022 season, the Western Michigan Broncos have announced that they will be joining the Missouri Valley Conference as affiliate members beginning in 2023. Fellow MAC members Bowling Green and Northern Illinois will join the Broncos in MVC men's soccer beginning in 2023. Following their successful 2022 season, the WMU Broncos became the last men's soccer team to win the MAC championship.

Notable alumni

 Sean Lewis (soccer) - Player for Indy Eleven, graduated in 2012
 Brandon Bye - Player for the New England Revolution, graduated in 2017
 Drew Shepherd - Former player for Toronto FC II, graduated in 2017
 Jake Rufe - Player for Birmingham Legion, graduated in 2018
 Samuel Biek - Player for German football club FC Rot-Weiß Erfurt, graduated in 2019

NCAA tournament results

Year-by-year results

References

External links
 

 
Soccer clubs in Michigan